is a Japanese footballer who plays for Kyoto Sanga.

Club statistics
Updated to 8 May 2021.

References

External links
Profile at Tokushima Vortis

1992 births
Living people
Fukuoka University alumni
Association football people from Okayama Prefecture
Japanese footballers
J1 League players
J2 League players
Sagan Tosu players
Tokushima Vortis players
Shonan Bellmare players
Nagoya Grampus players
Kyoto Sanga FC players
Association football forwards